Wye School is a British, mixed, secondary,  free school in Wye, Kent. , it is operated by United Learning.

History

Wye School opened in September 2013, following a community campaign for a free school in the Ashford area.

In June 2015, the school had its first Ofsted inspection and was judged to be 'Good'. That grading was confirmed in 2018.

Academic results
In 2018, the school's first students received their GCSE results. 66% achieved five or more 9-4/A*-C grades including English and mathematics.

In 2019, 78% of students achieved at least a grade 4 or above in both English and mathematics. Forty nine percent achieved grade 5 or above in both subjects.

References

External links
 Official site

Secondary schools in Kent
Free schools in England
Educational institutions established in 2013
2013 establishments in England
United Learning schools